Catazajá is a town and one of the 122 Municipalities of Chiapas, in southern Mexico. It covers an area of 621 km².

As of 2010, the municipality had a total population of 17,140, up from 15,709 as of 2005. 

As of 2010, the town of Catazajá had a population of 2,973. Other than the town of Catazajá, the municipality had 249 localities, the largest of which (with 2010 populations in parentheses) were: Punta Arena (1,365) and Loma Bonita (1,071), classified as rural.

References

Municipalities of Chiapas